Magnus III ( 1240 – 18 December 1290), also called Magnus Ladulås, was King of Sweden from 1275 until his death in 1290.

Name 
He was the first Magnus to rule Sweden for any length of time, not generally regarded as a usurper or a pretender (but third Magnus to have been proclaimed Sweden's king and ruled there). Later historians ascribe his epithet "Ladulås" – Barnlock – to a royal decree of 1279 or 1280 freeing the yeomanry from the duty to provide sustenance for travelling nobles and bishops ("Peasants! Lock your barns!"); another theory is that it's a corruption of Ladislaus, which could possibly have been his second name, considering his Slavic heritage. (Magnus's maternal great-grandmother was Sophia of Minsk, a Rurikid princess.) This king has also been referred to as Magnus I, but that is not recognized by any Swedish historians today.

In Finnish, Magnus is similarly known as Mauno Ladonlukko ("barnlock") or Mauno Birgerinpoika (Birgersson").

Early life 
Magnus, whose birth year has never been confirmed in modern times, was probably the second son of Birger Jarl (1200–66) and Princess Ingeborg, herself the sister of the childless King Eric XI and daughter of King Eric X. Thus, Valdemar Birgersson (1239–1302) was the eldest son and ruled as Valdemar, King of Sweden from 1250–1275, succeeding King Eric, their maternal uncle who ruled until 1250. Birger Jarl had designated Magnus as Jarl, henceforth titled Duke of Sweden, and as Valdemar's successor. Even after Valdemar's coming of age in 1257, Birger Jarl kept his grip over the country. After Birger's death in 1266 Valdemar came into conflict with Magnus who wanted the throne for himself.

Accession and marriage 
In 1275 Duke Magnus started a rebellion against his brother with Danish help, and ousted him from the throne. Valdemar was deposed by Magnus after the Battle of Hova in the forest of Tiveden on 14 June 1275. Magnus was elected king at the Stones of Mora (Mora stenar). In 1276, Magnus allegedly married a second wife Helwig, daughter of Gerard I of Holstein. Through her mother, Elizabeth of Mecklenburg, Helwig was a descendant of Christina, the putative daughter of King Sverker II. A papal annulment of Magnus' alleged first marriage and a dispensation for the second (necessary because of consanguinity) were issued ten years later, in 1286. Haelwig later acted as regent, probably 1290–1302 and 1320–1327.

Reign 
The deposed King Valdemar managed, with Danish help in turn, to regain provinces in Gothenland in the southern part of the kingdom, and Magnus had to recognize that in 1277. However, Magnus regained them about 1278 and assumed the additional title rex Gothorum, King of the Goths, starting the tradition of "King of the Swedes and the Goths".

King Magnus's youngest brother, Benedict (1254–1291), then archdeacon, acted as his Lord High Chancellor of Sweden, and in 1284 Magnus rewarded him with the Duchy of Finland.

Magnus died when his sons were yet underage. Magnus ordered his kinsman Torkel Knutsson, the Lord High Constable of Sweden as the guardian of his heir, the future King Birger, who was about ten years old at father's death.

Modern research
In spring 2011, archaeologists and osteologists from the University of Stockholm were given permission to open one of the royal graves in Riddarholm Church (Riddarholmskyrkan) in order to study the remains of what was presumed to be Magnus Ladulås and some of his relatives. SVT broadcast a presentation of the preliminary studies, where a number of results were presented; among others his sickly disposition. Carbon-14 tests dated the bones to the 15th century, indicating the remains could not be those of the king and his family. In December 2011, the researchers applied for permission to open the neighbouring sarcophagus, which has hitherto been presumed to contain the bones of a later king, Charles VIII.

Children 
From his alleged first (annulled) marriage to an unknown woman:
 Eric Magnusson (born c. 1275 – c. 1277)

From his second marriage to Helwig of Holstein:
 Ingeborg Magnusdotter of Sweden (born c. 1279); married King Eric VI of Denmark.
 Birger, King of Sweden (born c. 1280)
 Eric Magnuson, Duke of Sudermannia in 1302 and Halland etc. c 1305, born c. 1282. Died of starvation in 1318 at Nyköpingshus Castle while imprisoned by his brother King Birger.
 Waldemar Magnuson, Duke of Finland in 1302 and Öland 1310. Died of starvation 1318 at Nyköpingshus Castle while imprisoned by his brother, King Birger.
 Richeza Magnusdotter of Sweden (d. after 1347), Abbess of the convent of St. Clare's Priory, Stockholm.

References

External links

1240 births
1290 deaths
13th-century Swedish monarchs
Rulers of Finland
House of Bjelbo
Burials at Riddarholmen Church